La Nouvelle République du Centre-Ouest, commonly known as La Nouvelle République (La NR), is a French newspaper headquartered in Tours, Centre-Val de Loire.

References

External links

 La Nouvelle République du Centre-Ouest 

Newspapers published in France
Organizations based in Tours, France